Klein Forest High School  is a public senior high school in unincorporated Harris County, Texas, near Houston. It is a part of the Klein Independent School District.

It was the second high school built in Klein ISD. Opening in the Fall of 1979, Klein Forest welcomes students from the southern side of the district, including the Champions area of F.M. 1960. Klein Forest celebrated its 30th anniversary in 2009. There are two intermediate campuses and eight elementary schools within its feeder pattern. In the spring of 2011, Klein Forest opened an NCAA-modeled athletic facility. Klein Forest serves grades 9-12. A portion of the Near Northwest district is served by the school.

History

In 2017, areas of the Klein Forest zone between Cypress Creek and Farm to Market Road 1960 were rezoned to Klein High School.

2020 Firework incident 
On January 7, 2020, a firework went off during a lunch period at the school. The student responsible for the incident was detained and later expelled, and the only recorded casualties during the incident were 4 minor injuries.

Academics
During the 2001-02 school year, Klein Forest High School was recognized with the Blue Ribbon School Award of Excellence by the United States Department of Education, the highest award an American school can receive.

For the 2021-22 school year, the school received a C grade from the Texas Education Agency, with an overall score of 72 out of 100. The school received a C grade in two domains, Student Achievement (score of 70) and School Progress (score of 76), and a Not Rated grade in Closing the Gaps (score of 61). The school did not receive any of the seven possible distinction designations.

Feeder pattern
For the 2018-19 school year, students who attend these schools are within Klein Forest High School's attendance zone:

A small portion of Houston is within the school's attendance boundary.

Demographics
As of the 2020-21 school year, there were 2,447 students eligible for free lunch and 248 eligible for reduced-price lunch.

In 2020-21, the racial/ethnic distribution of students was:
65.3% Hispanic
22.2% Black
7.4% Asian
2.8% White
1.4% Two or More Races
0.7% American Indian/Alaskan
0.1% Pacific Islander

Sports
Klein Forest participates in football, basketball, baseball, volleyball, swimming/diving, golf, softball, track and field, cross-country, tennis, wrestling and soccer.

Notable graduates
Derrick Brew — Gold medalist in the Men's 4 × 400 m relay at the 2004 Summer Olympics.
Ron Edwards — NFL defensive tackle for the Kansas City Chiefs.
Charles Gaines — professional basketball player
Steve Jackson — NFL player; played safety for the Tennessee Titans from 1991–99
 Ben Pronsky, 1997 — stage and film actor
 Toure' Murry, 2008 — professional basketball player for the NBA's New York Knicks
Mark Saccomanno — player for the minor league Round Rock Express baseball team; drafted by the Houston Astros in 2003

Legal troubles

In 2014, Michael Van Deelen, a teacher at the school, filed a lawsuit against KISD in federal court, accusing it of ignoring complaints about poor behavior from students and retaliating against teachers who complain. In the lawsuit he stated, "Klein Forest High School has pervasive discipline problems. Many of the students can be characterized as violent, out-of-control and/or disruptive. The inappropriate behavior includes verbal abuse of teachers and other students, constant profanity, sexual innuendo, improper dress (including the wearing of 'hoodies' and drooping pants and shorts), skipping class, constant tardies, leaving class without permission, assault and battery."

References

External links

 Klein Forest High School
  hosted at Texas Educational Service Center 4

High schools in Harris County, Texas
Public high schools in Texas
1979 establishments in Texas
Educational institutions established in 1979